Saudi Arabia competed at the 2022 Winter Olympics in Beijing, China, from 4 to 20 February 2022. This marked the country's Winter Olympics debut. Saudi Arabia's team consisted of one male alpine skier, Fayik Abdi.

Abdi was the country's flagbearer during the opening ceremony. Meanwhile a volunteer was the flagbearer during the closing ceremony.

Competitors
The following is the list of number of competitors participating at the Games per sport/discipline.

Background
In early 2021, the Saudi Winter Sports Federation put out a call looking for skiers and snowboarders that could potentially compete for the country at the Olympics. Approximately 100 applications were received worldwide (including those with Saudi heritage overseas). Eight athletes were selected to undergo further training in the aim to qualify for the Olympics.

Alpine skiing

Saudi Arabia met the basic qualification standards to enter one male alpine skier. Two skiers were able to meet the standard, and ultimately Fayik Abdi was selected to compete for the country.

References

Nations at the 2022 Winter Olympics
2022
Winter Olympics